Weldon South Coblin, Jr. (born February 26, 1944) is an American Sinologist, linguist, and educator, best known for his studies of Chinese linguistics and Tibetan.

Life and career
Coblin attended the University of Washington as an undergraduate student, graduating with a B.A. in Chinese in 1967.  He then continued on at Washington as a graduate student under the Belgian Sinologist and Roman Catholic clergyman Fr. Paul Serruys, earning a Ph.D. in Chinese language and literature in 1972 with a dissertation entitled "An Introductory Study of Textual and Linguistic Problems in Erh-ya". After completing his Ph.D., Coblin stayed at Washington for one year as a teaching associate, then in 1973 joined the faculty of the University of Iowa, where he spent his entire career.

Early in his career he made many important contributions to Tibetan and Sino-Tibetan linguistics, but since the mid-1990s has worked primarily on alphabetic representations of Chinese. Starting around that time along with Jerry Norman he promoted a new direction in Chinese historical phonology making less use of the Qieyun and other rhyme books, and more use of the traditional comparative method. Coblin is an emeritus professor at the University of Iowa.

Selected works
Coblin, W. South (1972).  "An Introductory Study of Textual and Linguistic Problems in Erh-ya", Ph.D. dissertation (University of Washington).
 "Notes on Tibetan Verbal Morphology," T'oung Pao 52 (1976), pp. 45–70.

External links

 W. South Coblin, The University of Iowa.

'Phags-pa script scholars
American sinologists
1944 births
University of Washington College of Arts and Sciences alumni
University of Iowa faculty
Living people